Mattar is a surname. People with that name include:
 Ahmad Mattar, Singapore Former Minister of Environment
 Mattar (Brazilian footballer), full name Antônio Mattar Neto, Brazilian football forward
 Ali Mattar (born 1963), member of Bahrain's parliament
 Haitham Mattar,  Lebanese-American business executive
 Hassan Mattar,  (born 1956),  a Qatari former striker
 Luiz Mattar, Brazilian tennis player
 Maurício Mattar, (born 1964) is a Brazilian actor
 Philip Mattar, (born 1944), Palestinian-American historian
  Spiridon Mattar  (1921 – 2014), Melkite Greek Catholic Church leader

See also
 Matar (disambiguation)